Babinec is a village and municipality in the Rimavská Sobota District of the Banská Bystrica Region of Slovakia. Locals are now engaged in agriculture and fruit growing. In the village is classical lutheran church from 18th century.

History
A Bronze Age treasure has been excavated in the village. The current village arose in the 13th century from an older settlement. In historical records the village was first mentioned in 1407 as Babalawka. It belonged to the noble families Derencsényi and Széchy. In the 17th century it passed to the Muráň town. Inhabitants had been engaged in agriculture and fruit growing, in winter in basketry and in production of tools for agriculture and weaving.

Name Babinec
The village belongs to the places with quaint names in Slovakia. Babinec means in Slovak "A place of girls, women". Every year mayor organises a whole country meeting with a people with surname Babinec. Even today in the village live more women, than men.

Genealogical resources

The records for genealogical research are available at the state archive "Statny Archiv in Banska Bystrica, Slovakia"

 Roman Catholic church records (births/marriages/deaths): 1769-1851
 Lutheran church records (births/marriages/deaths): 1770-1866 (parish: B), 1867-1896 (parish: C)
 Census records 1869 of Babinec are not available at the state archive.

See also
 List of municipalities and towns in Slovakia

References

External links
 
 
https://www.webcitation.org/5QjNYnAux?url=http://www.statistics.sk/mosmis/eng/run.html
http://www.tourist-channel.sk/babinec/indexen.php3
Surnames of living people in Babinec
http://www.e-obce.sk/obec/babinec/babinec.html

Villages and municipalities in Rimavská Sobota District